Sailing at the 2013 Canada Summer Games was in Sherbrooke, Quebec on Lake Magog.  It was held from the 3 to 8 August.  There were 5 events of sailing.

Medal table
The following is the medal table for sailing at the 2013 Canada Summer Games.

Results

References

External links 

2013 Canada Summer Games
2013 in sailing
2013 Canada Games
Sailing competitions in Canada